Kum-Shoro is a village in the Osh Region of Kyrgyzstan. Its population was 819 in 2021.

References

Populated places in Osh Region